The Sigh of the Moor is an oil on canvas painting of Muhammad XII, (Boabdil), last Nasrid Emir of Granada. It was painted in the late 19th century by the Spanish artist Francisco Pradilla Ortiz. The painting depicts Boabdil, having ceded Granada to the Catholic Monarchs of Spain, Ferdinand and Isabella, turning to take a last look at the city he has lost, before going into exile.

History

The picture
The painting depicts Muhammad XII, the last Nasrid ruler of Granada, turning to take his final look at the city from the Puerto del Suspiro del Moro before going into exile. Boabdil was upbraided by his mother, Aixa; “weep like a woman for the kingdom you could not defend like a man.” Historians have generally followed Aixa in condemning Boabdil, but a 21st-century revisionist view by Elizabeth Drayson, a historian at the University of Cambridge, sees him as; “a last stand against religious intolerance, fanatical power and cultural ignorance”.

The Treaty of Granada, also known as the Capitulations, agreed in 1491 between Boabdil and Ferdinand and Isabella, was signed on 2 January 1492. It concluded the Granada War and brought to an end Arab rule in Spain which had begun with the Umayyad conquest in 711.

The artist
Francisco Pradilla (1848-1921) served brief terms as director, firstly of the Royal Academy of Spain in Rome and then at the Prado Museum, but worked primarily as a practising artist. The painting was begun at around the same time as Pradillo’s The Surrender of Granada, commissioned by the Spanish Senate, the upper house of the Cortes Generales, in 1879. However, Pradillo appears not to have completed it until around 1892. The picture was sold at auction in 2018 and remains privately owned. In 2021 the painting was declared an Asset of Cultural Interest (BIC).

Description
The painting is oil on canvas and is 1.95m high and 3.02m wide.

Gallery

Notes

References

Sources 
 
 

1892 paintings
Orientalist paintings
Horses in art
Emirate of Granada
Sultans of Granada
Nasrid dynasty
History of Al-Andalus